Evelyn Rose Matthei Fornet (born November 11, 1953) is a Chilean politician who served as Minister of Labor and Social Security under Chilean President Sebastián Piñera until July 2013. She was the Independent Democrat Union Party's nominee for President of Chile in the 2013 elections. She is currently serving her second term as the mayor of Providencia.

Matthei began her career as a lecturer at the Pontifical Catholic University of Chile, before working in management in the private sector. Following Chile's return to democracy in 1989, she successfully ran for Deputy of the 23rd Electoral District the year after. Matthei remained in Congress, serving another term as Deputy and being elected Senator twice before she was appointed to the Cabinet in 2011.

Besides her political career, Matthei is also an accomplished pianist.

Family and education

Matthei was born in Santiago de Chile, the second child of Elda Fornet Fernández and Fernando Matthei Aubel, a military officer. Her father was Minister of Health during Augusto Pinochet’s government; later becoming Commander-in-chief of the Air Force, and in this capacity, a member of the Military Junta until Chile’s return to democracy.

As a child, Matthei's family were friends with Michelle Bachelet and her family. Bachelet later became president of Chile and in 2013 Matthei challenged her for the presidency.

During her secondary education, Matthei developed a passion for music and piano, and upon graduation expressed interest in becoming a concert pianist. Matthei was able to obtain scholarships for her studies. Following graduation, she took the admissions exams for university; but at the time her father was appointed military attaché to the Chilean Embassy in London, and she decided to pursue her piano career in Britain. Three years later, she realized she would not become a concert pianist and decided to return to Chile.

In 1974 Matthei started studying at the Economics Institute of the Pontifical Catholic University of Chile, from which she received a licentiate in Economics after four years. She completed her undergraduate degree in Economics and was awarded a prize as the top economics student of her year, but her thesis was stolen, preventing her from completing the requirements for a professional licence in business.

While studying, Matthei worked as a research assistant. She collaborated with former President Sebastián Piñera on a Latin American Economic Commission paper on poverty in the region; as well as a helping develop a textbook on Monetary Theory with Professor Hernando Cortés for the Economics Institute of her University.

Early career
Matthei became a professor of International Economics at the Economics Institute of the Pontifical Catholic University of Chile. After working a year as a researcher in a private consultancy, Forestal S.A. she became an analyst in the Superintendencia de AFP, the government body overseeing operation of Chile's by then privatized pension system. Less than a year later she was promoted to head of department.

In 1986 she resigned her government position to become VP of Tourism, Commerce and Securities at Bancard S.A. a position she'd keep until being elected Deputy four years later. In 1988 she was invited to become an adviser for the Social and Economic Commission, and returned to teaching at the Catholic University, this time as a Professor of Introduction to Economics. In November 2015 she announced that she was returning to politics and that she will run for major of Providencia in the municipal elections of 2016.

Political career
Matthei entered Chilean politics in the late 1980s, after the military government relaxed control over political activity. She joined National Renewal party's youth group called Patrulla Juvenil ("Youth Patrol"), along with future President of Chile Sebastián Piñera, and future fellow senator and minister Andrés Allamand. She was a member of the party's Political Commission and later elected its National Vice president.

In 1990, she was National Renewal's candidate for Deputy for the 23rd Electoral district, representing the upscale communes of Las Condes, Vitacura, and Lo Barnechea, winning by a broad margin. Following her increasing popularity, Matthei was tapped as a potential presidential candidate for the center-right Democracy and Progress Coalition. However, following a highly publicized wire-tapping scandal in 1993 known as  Piñeragate,  involving her and rival presidential hopeful Sebastián Piñera, she was forced to desist from her presidential bid. Disgusted with the way National Renewal leaders dealt with the scandal, she resigned from the party and continued her political career as an independent until 1999.

In 1994, she opted to run for Deputy of the 15th Electoral District of San Antonio, winning the seat as an independent with support from the Independent Democrat Union (UDI) party. Upon completion of her term, Matthei was elected senator in 1997, representing the Coquimbo Region, being re-elected in 2005. In 1999, she joined the Independent Democrat Union. As Senator, she became the first woman to preside over the Senate Budget and Oversight Committee. Matthei resigned from her seat in January 2011 when she was appointed Minister of Labor and Social Security by President Sebastián Piñera.

As Minister, Matthei gained notoriety for her fiery personality and was the center of several heated exchanges with members both of the governing coalition and the opposition. Her relatively liberal views on abortion, same-sex marriage and tax reform deepened a growing rift with her own party, and in March 2013, she confided that she had decided to quit politics following completion of her term as Minister.

On July 17, and after winning the primary, UDI presidential candidate Pablo Longueira resigned citing health reasons. Three days later, the Political Commission of the party unanimously proclaimed Evelyn Matthei as their new presidential candidate for the elections in November. On December 15, 2013 she lost the presidential election to socialist candidate Michelle Bachelet 62% to 38%.

Personal life
Evelyn Matthei is married to fellow economist and former Chilean Central Bank Deputy Governor Jorge Desormeaux, with whom she has three children. She is a classically trained pianist, and speaks English and German as well as her native Spanish.

Electoral history 

1989 parliamentary elections

Deputy for the District No. 23 (Las Condes, Vitacura and Lo Barnechea), Santiago Metropolitan Region

 1993 parliamentary elections

Deputy for District No. 15 (San Antonio), Valparaíso Region

 1997 parliamentary elections

Senator for the Circunscription No. 4 (Coquimbo Region)

 2005 parliamentary elections

Senator for the Circunscription No. 4 (Coquimbo Region)

References

External links 

Official campaign web site
Biography of Evelyn Matthei by CIDOB (in Spanish)

1953 births
Candidates for President of Chile
20th-century Chilean economists
Chilean people of French descent
Chilean people of German descent
Chilean people of Spanish descent
Chilean people of Swiss descent
Independent Democratic Union politicians
Living people
Members of the Chamber of Deputies of Chile
Members of the Senate of Chile
Politicians from Santiago
Pontifical Catholic University of Chile alumni
20th-century Chilean women politicians
20th-century Chilean politicians
21st-century Chilean women politicians
Women members of the Chamber of Deputies of Chile
Women members of the Senate of Chile
Women mayors of places in Chile
Mayors of Providencia